Roxita capacunca is a moth in the family Crambidae. It was described by W. Li and H. Li in 2009. It is found in China (Zhejiang).

References

Crambinae
Moths described in 2009